Guitar is the first album by American guitarist Tony Rice, released in 1973.

At first, this album was issued by Red Clay Records, Japanese bluegrass album label, entitled "got me a martin guitar" in 1973.

Track listing 
 "Freeborn Man" (Keith Allison, Mark Lindsay) 2:49
 "Faded Love" (Bob Wills) 6:30
 "Salt Creek" (Traditional) 3:45
 "Doing My Time" (Jimmie Skinner) 4:06
 "Windy And Warm" (John D. Loudermilk) 1:31
 "John Hardy" (Traditional) 3:29
 "Nine Pound Hammer" (Merle Travis) 2:17
 "Lonesome Reuben" (Traditional) 8:56

Personnel
 Tony Rice – guitar, vocals
 Larry Rice - mandolin, vocals
 Bobby Slone - bass, violin
 J.D. Crowe - banjo, vocals

References

1973 debut albums
Tony Rice albums
Rebel Records albums